Turbonilla deboeri is a species of sea snail, a marine gastropod mollusk in the family Pyramidellidae, the pyrams and their allies.

Description
The shell grows to a length of 5.7 mm

Distribution
This marine species occurs off Aruba.

References

External links
 To Encyclopedia of Life
 To World Register of Marine Species

deboeri
Gastropods described in 1988